"Othello" is a 1964 Australian television play based on the play by William Shakespeare. It was broadcast on the ABC as part of Wednesday Theatre and filmed in the ABC's Melbourne studios.

It was one of the most ambitious projects made in Melbourne, going for over two hours without a break.

Cast
Raymond Westwell as Othello
Keith Lee as Iago
Frances McDonald as Desdemona
Joan MacArthur as Emilia
Judith Arthy as Bianca
John Gregg as Cassio
Terry Norris as Rodrigo
Don Crosby

Production
Raymond Westwell had played generals on Australian TV in The Angry General and Romanoff and Juliet as well as on stage in Ross. "But Othello the Moor is perhaps the stage's greatest general and a part I have been conceited enough to want to have a go at for years", said Westwell.

The actor had appeared in various productions of the play overseas but this was the first time he had played the title character. He had seen Laurence Olivier, Anthony Quayle and Paul Robeson play the part. "There are a thousand ways of doing this play and many arguments for and against Othello being portrayed either as a Negro or an Arab," said Westwell.  "Sir Laurence Olivier played him as a negro and won tremendous acclaim last year. However Patrick Barton and I feel that Shakespeare intended him to be an Arab."

Frances McDonald made her TV debut.

Reception
The Sydney Morning Herald said "the emotional trivialities of the minor characters were excellently handled" but felt Othello was "rather too much an English country gentleman" and Keith Lee played his part "as a man believing in nothing apart from himself."

References

External links
 

1964 television plays
1964 Australian television episodes
1960s Australian television plays
Wednesday Theatre (season 1) episodes
Works based on Othello